Enfield Southgate is a constituency in the House of Commons of the UK Parliament. It was created in 1950 as Southgate, and has been represented since 2017 by Bambos Charalambous, a member of the Labour Party.

History 
From 1950 to the 1983 general election, this constituency was known as Southgate. The prefix of the seat's London Borough was added to some parts of the legislation, but not others, in 1974.

It was regarded as a safe seat for the Conservative party, but it gained national attention in the 1997 general election when Michael Portillo, Secretary of State for Defence was unexpectedly defeated on a massive swing - the 'Portillo moment'. Portillo had been widely expected to contest the Conservative leadership and his defeat the media took to epitomise the Labour landslide victory. The victorious candidate, Stephen Twigg, increased his majority at the following election. In the 2005 general election, Twigg's majority was the largest overturned, with a swing of 8.7% to the Conservative candidate David Burrowes.

The 2015 result gave the seat the 60th most marginal majority of the Conservative Party's 331 seats by percentage of majority, with Labour gaining the seat in the 2017 general election on a substantial 9.7% swing. 
Enfield Southgate is one of five constituencies, the others being Croydon Central, Leeds North West, Peterborough and Reading East, which elected Labour MPs in 2017 having not done so since 2001. Bambos Charalambous in 2019 became the first Labour MP in Enfield Southgate to be re-elected with a reduced share of the vote.

Constituency profile
This constituency is located in the western parts of the London Borough of Enfield. Less out-of-work benefits  (7.4%) are claimed here than the average for London (8.4%, which compares to 6.4% nationally in April 2021) and among those aged 18 to 24 the percentage is 10.4% in the seat during the COVID-19 pandemic. For the year 2020, 71.3% of employees fell into the top three occupation groups of nine assessed by government, which is above the London and national average. It has significant Jewish, Muslim and Cypriot communities.

In recent years, the south-eastern and southern wards of the constituency, including Bowes and Palmers Green have returned Labour local councillors, with some councillors also in Southgate Green and Winchmore Hill. These wards tend to give the bulk of the Labour vote. The remaining wards generally elect Conservative councillors.

To the north, the seat is semi-rural taking in Trent Park and the former campus of Middlesex University, and the Cockfosters terminus of the Piccadilly line, stretching into the wealthy Hadley Wood area. Some areas (smaller than local government wards) in the south of the constituency have middle rankings of deprivation when placed in a complete list of wards (such as the 2000 Index of Multiple Deprivation), however all other output areas lack any significant deprivation.

Boundaries 

1950–1974: The Municipal Borough of Southgate.

1974–1983: The London Borough of Enfield wards of Arnos, Bowes, Cockfosters, Grange, Highfield, Oakwood, Palmers Green, Southgate Green, West, and Winchmore Hill.

1983–2010: The London Borough of Enfield wards of Arnos, Bowes, Grange, Grovelands, Highfield, Merryhills, Oakwood, Palmers Green, Southgate Green, Trent, and Winchmore Hill.

2010–present: The London Borough of Enfield wards of Bowes, Cockfosters, Grange, Palmers Green, Southgate, Southgate Green, and Winchmore Hill.

Boundary review

5th Boundary review 2000–2007

The Boundary Commission for England recommended changes, which were approved, to the seat and effective from 2010. Part of Highlands ward went to Enfield North; part of Grange ward came in reverse. Parts of Grange; Bowes; and Palmers Green wards were added to the seat from Edmonton. Part of wards: Bush Hill Park and Upper Edmonton supplemented Edmonton.

Members of Parliament

Elections

Elections in the 2010s

Elections in the 2000s

Elections in the 1990s

Elections in the 1980s

Elections in the 1970s

Elections in the 1960s

Elections in the 1950s

Graphical representation

See also 
 List of parliamentary constituencies in London

Notes

References

External links 
Politics Resources (Election results from 1922 onwards)
Electoral Calculus (Election results from 1955 onwards)

Parliamentary constituencies in London
Politics of the London Borough of Enfield
Constituencies of the Parliament of the United Kingdom established in 1950
Constituencies of the Parliament of the United Kingdom established in 1983
Southgate, London